Bradinopyga is a genus of dragonflies in the family Libellulidae. It contains the following species:
Bradinopyga cornuta  – horned rock-dweller
Bradinopyga geminata  – granite ghost
Bradinopyga konkanensis  – Konkan rockdweller
Bradinopyga strachani  – red rock-dweller

The name is derived from Aeolic Greek bradinos (=rhadinos) meaning slender or pliable and Greek pyge for rump or buttock.

References

Libellulidae
Taxa named by William Forsell Kirby
Anisoptera genera
Taxonomy articles created by Polbot